Ronald Michaud is an American cartoonist. He received the National Cartoonist Society Advertising and Illustration Award in 1969 and 1983 for his work.

External links
 NCS Awards

American cartoonists
Possibly living people
Year of birth missing
Place of birth missing